11P, 11.P, etc. may refer to:

11p, the shorter arm of human chromosome 11
11P/Tempel-Swift-LINEAR, a comet
IEEE 802.11p, an 802.11 wireless access protocol for vehicular environments
SpaceShipOne flight 11P, a flight of SpaceShipOne

See also
 P11 (disambiguation)

ja:11P